In Danish, Norwegian, and Swedish academia, a doctoral ring may be bestowed upon the conferral of a doctorate.

Sweden
Together with the doctoral hat or laurel wreath, it forms part of the academic regalia in Sweden. Swedish doctoral rings are made of gold, either standard or white gold, and in a design specific to the conferring faculty. While the doctoral hat or laurel wreath has no use outside academic events, the ring is intended to be worn in daily life and is typically worn on the ring finger of the left hand.

Denmark

The Danish doctoral ring was introduced in 1824. The current design was created by medallist Harald Conradsen in 1866 and features a gold plate with a portrait of Pallas Athena surrounded by a laurel wreath. The ring is not awarded as such, but the doctoral title enables the recipient to purchase the figured plate from the University of Copenhagen which is the facilitator of this service. If the doctor wishes it attached to an actual ring, the doctor must purchase this service from a jeweller at their own expense. The ring is normally worn on the index finger of the right hand.

References

 Article with illustrations from 1907 Nordisk familjebok (in Swedish)

Academic dress
Rings (jewellery)
Metal rings